Guillermo Hernandez can refer to

Willie Hernández (born 1954), baseball player
Gilmer Hernandez, police officer
Guillermo Hernández-Cartaya (born 1932), banker
Guillermo Hernandez (tennis), Filipino tennis player
Guillermo Hernández (footballer) (born 1942), Mexican soccer player